Villanueva de las Peras is a municipality located in the province of Zamora, Castile and León, Spain. According to the 2007 census (INE), the municipality has a population of 147 inhabitants.

See another view of the church

Municipalities of the Province of Zamora